The London, Brighton and South Coast Railway (LB&SCR) E2 class was a class of 0-6-0T steam locomotives designed by Lawson Billinton, intended for shunting and short distance freight trains.  Ten examples were built between 1913 and 1916, and were withdrawn from service and scrapped between 1961 and 1963.

Background
By 1910 many of the Stroudley E1 class locomotives were worn out or inadequate for the heavier duties required of them. D. E. Marsh intended to rebuild some examples with a larger boiler, but only one E1X rebuild had been completed by the time of his unexpected retirement. Marsh's successor Billinton reversed this policy and instead ordered five new, more powerful locomotives from Brighton works. The new class included several features found on other LB&SCR classes including an I2 class boiler. They were delivered between June 1913 and January 1914.

Second Series
The new design was judged to be successful, except that they were found to have inadequate water supply. Thus when a further order for five locomotives was placed they were given extended side tanks. The second batch were delayed by the onset of the war but were eventually delivered between June 1915 and October 1916.

Use
The E2 class locomotives were mainly used for the heavier shunting and short distance freight duties in the London area and on the south coast, as their small coal bunkers made them unsuitable for long trips. These included empty stock workings at Victoria and London Bridge Stations.

Two were tried in 1914 as passenger locomotives on push-pull duties with the locomotives in the middle of a rake of six coaches, but the experiment was abandoned during the same year as they had insufficient coal capacity.

Following the electrification of the Brighton line in 1936 the class was used as replacements for the former London Chatham and Dover Railway T class at the Herne Hill marshalling yard, around Victoria station and at Dover harbour. During the Second World War they also replaced the SR Z class at Hither Green marshalling yard.

In the mid-1950s the class were tried out as shunters at Southampton Docks and found to be useful. Six examples were retained for this purpose until their replacement by British Rail Class 07 diesel shunters in 1962.

Withdrawal of the class took place between February 1961 and April 1963 and were all scrapped. None have survived to preservation.

Locomotive summary

Thomas the Tank Engine

In 1946, Reginald Payne used the later series of E2 locomotives as the basis for the character Thomas the Tank Engine in the second book of The Railway Series by the Reverend W. Awdry.

00 Gauge models
Trix produced a model of the first series Class E2 in 1961.  It was designed for the Trix Twin 3-rail system but could be converted to 2-rail using the optional 2-rail pick up included with the locomotive.

Hornby produced the locomotive in its earliest form as an 00 gauge model. Production lasted from 1979 to 1985 in three distinct variants with four reference numbers. In 1985 the tooling was retired and after some alterations, was instead used as the basis for the Thomas the Tank Engine model.

Bachmann have also produced several different-coloured E2-based models in their Junior Range.

References

External links

 Railuk database
 LB&SCR online, E2 class
 Southern E-Group – LB&SCR E2 Class page

0-6-0T locomotives
E2
Railway locomotives introduced in 1913
Scrapped locomotives